Nandkheda is a village in Parbhani taluka of Parbhani district of Maharashtra state in India.

Demography
According to the 2011 census of India, Nandkheda had a population of 2295, of which 1175 were male and 1120 were female. The average sex ratio of the village was 953, which was above than the Maharashtra state average of 929. The literacy rate was 69.87% compared to 82.3% for the state. Male literacy rate was 78% while female literacy rate was 62%.

Geography and Transport
Following table shows distance of Nandkheda from some of major cities.

References

Villages in Parbhani district